Carex tetanica, also known as rigid sedge, is a species of flowering plant in the sedge family, Cyperaceae. It is native to Central and Eastern Canada and the  United States.

See also
 List of Carex species

References

tetanica
Plants described in 1806
Flora of North America